Fehmarn-Burg station is a railway station in the municipality of Burg auf Fehmarn, located in the Ostholstein district in Schleswig-Holstein, Germany.

Beginning August 31, 2022, all rail traffic between Neustadt and Puttgarden, including at Fehmarn-Burg station, is suspended due to construction work on the double-track railway line connecting to the Fehmarn Belt Fixed Link. The traffic is replaced by a bus service. It is expected that regional trains will go to Fehmarn-Burg again when the railway is rebuilt and in traffic again, around 2029, then as end point of the line.

References

Railway stations in Schleswig-Holstein
Buildings and structures in Ostholstein
Railway stations in Germany opened in 2010